Admiral Zozulya was the lead ship of the Soviet Navy Project 1134 Admiral Zozulya-class Large Anti-submarine Ship (BPK) also known as the Kresta I Class guided missile cruisers. Launched in 1965, the ship was reclassified a Large Rocket Ship (RKR) in 1977. Admiral Zozulya served primarily in the Northern Fleet during the Cold War, transferring to the Russian Navy at the dissolution of the Soviet Navy, and was decommissioned in 1994 after nearly thirty years of service.

Design and development

Design
Envisioned as the first of a large class of a more balanced follow-on ships to the specialist anti-ship Project 58 class, Admiral Zozulya was larger, displacing  standard and  full load, and stretching  in length. The hull was made of steel upon which was mounted a large aluminium-magnesium alloy superstructure dominated by a radar complex including MR-500, MR-310 Angara-A, MRP-11-12, MRP-13-14 Uspekh-U and MRP-15-16 Zaliv search radars and a Volga navigation radar.

Power was provided by two TV-12 steam turbines, fuelled by four KVN-98/64 boilers and driving two fixed pitch screws that provided . Electricity was provided by a TD-760 driven off steam drawn from the main boilers which powered a 380 V AC circuit at a frequency of 50 Hz.

Armament
Admiral Zozulya was originally intended to mount the P-500 Bazalt (NATO reporting name SS-N-12 'Sandbox') but protracted development meant that instead the same 4K44 missiles (SS-N-3 'Shaddock') as the Project 50 warships mounted were retained. However, they were launched from two specially designed twin KT-35-1134 P-35 launchers mounted midships. Similarly, anti-aircraft defence was to be based around the new M-11 Shtorm (SA-N-3 'Goblet') system but this did not become operational until 1969. Instead, protection was enhanced by mounting two twin ZIF-102 M-1 Volna-M launchers, one forward and the other aft, and up to 64 4K91 (SA-N-1 'Goa') missiles, which was supplemented by two twin  AK-725 guns.

Defence against submarines was provided by two quintuple  torpedo launchers, a pair of six-barrelled RBU-1000 Smerch-3 launchers for  anti-submarine rockets and a pair of twelve-barrelled RBU-6000 Smerch-2 launchers for  anti-submarine rockets. A vastly improved anti-submarine sensor suite was also fitted, with MG-312M Titan and GAS-311 Vychegda sonars, the MG-26 Khosta underwater communication system and both MI-110R and MI-110K anti-submarine search stations. Fire control was directed by two 4R90 Yatagan units along with Binom-1134, MR-103 Bars, Grozna-1134 and Burya-1134 fire control systems along with a ARP-50R radio direction finder. Threat response was coordinated with a Planshet-1134 combat information control system.

The ship was equipped with an aft landing pad and hangar for a ranging Kamov Ka-25 helicopter, the first installed on a Soviet cruiser.

In the early 1970s, Admiral Zozulya was upgraded with a MR-212 Vaygach navigation radar added and the missiles updated to 4M44. The ship underwent extensive modernisation between 1985 and 1991, including the addition of four AK-630 close-in weapon systems, with their attendant fire control radars, installed near the bridge to improve anti-missile defence.

Development
Admiral Zozulya was approved by Nikita Khrushchev as part of Sergey Gorshkov's buildup of the Soviet Navy. The vessel was laid down on 26 July 1964 at A.A. Zhdanov in Leningrad with yard number 791, and launched on 17 October 1965. The total cost of construction was 32 million rubles.

Service
Admiral Zozulya began testing on 15 February 1967, covering  in 995 running hours, and was completed on 8 October 1967. Almost immediately, the vessel formed part of a naval parade in honour of the 50th anniversary of the October Revolution on 7 November. On 18 January 1968, the ship was attached to the 120th Missile Ship Brigade of the Northern Fleet based at Severomorsk, remaining part of that unit until 9 October 1986. While serving in the Brigade, the vessel was awarded the Navy Prize for Air Defence. The first launch of a P-35 missile was in October 1968.

Throughout 1968 and 1969, the ship took part in exercises until 1 December 1969 when Admiral Zozulya was dispatched to the Mediterranean Sea to operate with Egyptian armed forces and then later sailed in the Atlantic Ocean on 30 April 1970 after taking part in Okean-70. The ship returned to Leningrad for repairs and modernisation in November 1971, re-entering service in June 1974.

On 3 August 1978, the vessel was renamed a Large Rocket Ship (RKR). Shortly afterwards, in September 1978, Admiral Zozulya joined  to monitor NATO exercise Northern Wedding, later taking part in the Soviet exercise Atlantika-84 between 31 March and 8 April 1984. During modernisation, the vessel was assigned to the Baltic Fleet, joining the 12th Missile Ship Division in May 1992. However, Admiral Zozulya did not serve long in that capacity and was decommissioned on 29 September 1994 and was broken up in the Baltic in 1995.

Pennant numbers

Notes

References

Citations

Bibliography

Ships built at Severnaya Verf
1965 ships
Kresta I-class cruisers
Cold War cruisers of the Soviet Union